John Campbell Arbuthnott, 16th Viscount of Arbuthnott,  (26 October 1924 – 14 July 2012) was a Scottish peer, Lord Lieutenant of Kincardineshire (1977–99) and a notable businessman.

Education
Arbuthnott was educated at Fettes College, Edinburgh and at Gonville and Caius College, Cambridge, where he studied estate management graduating with a BA degree in 1949; and a MA degree in 1967. He held an Honorary LL.D. degree from Aberdeen University (1995).

War service
During the Second World War, Arbuthnott served in the near and Far East and Pacific theatre (1944–45) with the Fleet Air Arm of the Royal Navy (1942–46), and was awarded the Distinguished Service Cross (DSC) in 1945.

Career
Arbuthnott was a chartered surveyor and a Fellow of the Royal Institution of Chartered Surveyors (FRICS), a Land Agent, a Justice of the Peace (JP) and a Lieutenant in the Royal Naval Volunteer Reserve. He served with the Agricultural Land Service division of the Ministry of Agriculture (1949–55), was Senior Land Agent for Nature Conservancy in Scotland (1955–67), member of the Countryside Commission (Scotland; 1968–71), Chairman of the Red Deer Commission 1969–75, President of the British Association for Shooting and Conservation (1973–92), President of the Scottish Landowners' Federation (1974–79), and a member of the Royal Zoological Society of Scotland (1976–2012), Scottish Agricultural Organisation Society (1980–1983), the RSGS (1983–2012); Federation of Agricultural Co-operatives (UK) Ltd (1983–2012); Deputy Chairman of the Nature Conservancy Council (1980–85); and Chairman of the Advisory Committee for Scotland (1980–85).

Arbuthnott was a director of Aberdeen & Northern Estates (1973–91; chairman, 1986–91), and served as a director of the investment firm Scottish Widows (1978–1994), and was elected as chairman of the society (1984–87). He was a member (1979–85) of the Scottish North investment Trust, and a director of Britoil plc (1988–90), and joined the British Petroleum (BP) Scottish Advisory Board (1990–96). In 1985, Clydesdale Bank appointed Arbuthnott as a main board director, a position that lasted until 1992.

Affiliations
Arbuthnott was Fellow of the Royal Society of Arts (FRSA) and a Fellow of the Royal Society of Edinburgh (FRSE), Prior of the Scottish Venerable Order of St John (GCStJ) (1983–95), and served as Lord High Commissioner to the General Assembly of the Church of Scotland (May 1986–87), on the Royal Commission on Historic Manuscripts (1987–94), and a member of the Aberdeen University Court (1978–84), and Liveryman of the Worshipful Company of Farmers.

Honours
Arbuthnott was appointed a Commander of the Order of the British Empire (CBE) in the 1986 New Year Honours, and made a Knight of the Order of the Thistle (KT) in 1996.

Death
Following Arbuthnott's death, a service of thanksgiving for his life was held at St Machar's Cathedral, Aberdeen, on 14 September 2012.

Family
Arbuthnott was the son of Major General (Robert) Keith Arbuthnott, 15th Viscount of Arbuthnott. He married Mary Elizabeth Darley Oxley (died 16 January 2010) on 3 September 1949; they had two children, one son and one daughter:
 Keith Arbuthnott, 17th Viscount of Arbuthnott (born 18 July 1950)
 Susanna Mary Arbuthnott (born 1 May 1954)

References

Links

External links

Scottish clan chiefs
1924 births
2012 deaths
Royal Navy officers
Scottish military personnel
People from Kincardine and Mearns
Alumni of Gonville and Caius College, Cambridge
Fellows of the Royal Society of Edinburgh
Fellows of the Royal Scottish Geographical Society
Presidents of the Royal Scottish Geographical Society
Knights of the Thistle
Commanders of the Order of the British Empire
Recipients of the Distinguished Service Cross (United Kingdom)
Bailiffs Grand Cross of the Order of St John
Lord-Lieutenants of Kincardineshire
Scottish surveyors
Scottish lawyers
Scottish Presbyterians
20th-century Scottish businesspeople
21st-century Scottish businesspeople
Scottish justices of the peace
People educated at Fettes College
John Arbuthnott, 16th Viscount
Royal Naval Volunteer Reserve personnel of World War II
Lords High Commissioner to the General Assembly of the Church of Scotland
Scottish landowners
16
Fleet Air Arm personnel of World War II
Royal Navy officers of World War II
Arbuthnott